Leadership Council may refer to:

Politics and government
Leadership Council of Afghanistan, the Taliban's top government body
Presidential Leadership Council, the executive body of Yemen's internationally-recognized transitional government

Nonprofits
The Leadership Council, a British global issues think tank
Leadership Council of Conservative Judaism, an American body composed of leaders of multiple conservative Jewish organizations